The Committee of the Verkhovna Rada of Ukraine on Environmental Policy, Nature Resources Utilization and Elimination of the Consequences of Chornobyl Catastrophe is a standing committee of the Verkhovna Rada, Ukraine's unicameral parliament. The committee consists of 15 people's deputies in the parliament's 8th convocation. Its entire composition was approved on December 4, 2014.

History 
Legislative development of the environmental policy of the Ukrainian state began on July 16, 1990, with the adoption by the Verkhovna Rada of the Declaration of State Sovereignty of Ukraine. The Declaration states that the Ukrainian state independently establishes the procedure for organizing nature protection on the territory of the Republic and the procedure for using natural resources, has its own national commission for radiation protection, has the right to prohibit construction and cease operation of any enterprises, institutions, organizations and other facilities.

Officially the Committee was created on June 28, 1990 during the twelfth convocation of the Verkhovna Rada of the Ukrainian Soviet Socialist Republic (first convocation of the Verkhovna Rada of Ukraine) as the "Permanent Commission of the Verkhovna Rada of the Ukrainian SSR on issues of ecology and sustainable use of natural resources". At the time, the commission of the Verkhovna Rada on issues of the Chornobyl disaster was a separate commission, which was merged with the commission on issues of ecology during the parliament's third convocation.

In June 1992, at the UN Conference on Environment and Development in Rio de Janeiro (Brazil), 155 states, including Ukraine, signed the UN Framework Convention on Climate Change. The Verkhovna Rada of Ukraine ratified this Convention on October 29, 1996.

Currently, Ukraine is a party to 20 global and regional environmental conventions and 5 additional protocols and amendments to the convention.

Presidium
On December 4, 2014, the Committee of the Verkhovna Rada of Ukraine on issues of ecological policy's composition was approved by the Verkhovna Rada. Its presidium consists of five deputies:

Scope
The Committee of the Verkhovna Rada on issues of ecological policy's scope is recognized as follows:

 protection, conservation, use, and recovery of natural resources, including mineral resources, forests, water, air, plant and animal wildlife, natural landscapes;
 conservation and sustainable use of natural resources of the maritime economic zone, the continental shelf, and space exploration;
 environmental safety, prevention and elimination of natural disasters, industrial accidents and disasters, the activities of public emergency services;
 radiation and fire safety;
 civil protection;
 legal regime of environmental emergency zones;

 state policy on waste, including radioactive and toxic waste;
 state monitoring of the environment;
 administrative and economic penalties for environmental pollution;
 creation, protection and development of natural reserve fund of Ukraine;
 terms of recovery, including consent to be bound by international treaties of Ukraine on these issues;
 social protection of citizens affected by the Chornobyl disaster;
 environmental insurance and environmental audits;

Subcommittees
The Committee of the Verkhovna Rada on issues of ecological policy consists of the following subcommittees:

 Subcommittee on the protection and rational use of mineral and water resources
 Subcommittee on the forest resources of flora/fauna, landscapes and natural reserve fund
 Subcommittee on the state environmental monitoring

 Subcommittee on the public policy in the field of waste management
 Subcommittee on the Chornobyl, social protection of victims of the Chornobyl disaster
 Subcommittee on the civil protection and disaster relief of man-made or natural disasters

See also
 Ministry of Ecology and Natural Resources, in the Cabinet of Ministers of Ukraine

References

External links
 
 

Ecological
Government agencies established in 1990
1990 establishments in Ukraine
1990 in the environment
Environmental policies organizations
Environment of Ukraine
Environmental issues in Ukraine
Radiation protection organizations